Sorbus heilingensis is a species of plant in the family Rosaceae. It is endemic to Germany.

Sources
 Schmidt, P.A. 1998.  Sorbus heilingensis.   2006 IUCN Red List of Threatened Species.   Downloaded on 23 August 2007.

Flora of Germany
heilingensis
Vulnerable plants
Endemic flora of Germany
Taxonomy articles created by Polbot